Silometopus is a genus of sheet weavers that was first described by Eugène Louis Simon in 1926.

Species
 it contains eighteen species, found in Asia and Europe:
Silometopus acutus Holm, 1977 – Sweden, Poland, Russia (Europe)
Silometopus ambiguus (O. Pickard-Cambridge, 1906) – Western and northern Europe
Silometopus bonessi Casemir, 1970 – Belgium, Switzerland, Austria, Germany, Slovakia
Silometopus braunianus Thaler, 1978 – Alps (Switzerland, Italy, Austria)
Silometopus crassipedis Tanasevitch & Piterkina, 2007 – Russia (Europe), Kazakhstan
Silometopus curtus (Simon, 1881) (type) – Spain, France, ?Hungary, ?Malta, ?Egypt
Silometopus elegans (O. Pickard-Cambridge, 1873) – Europe, Russia (Europe to Central Asia/Siberia)
Silometopus elton Tanasevitch & Grushko, 2020 – Russia (Europe)
Silometopus graecus Bosmans, 2020 – Greece
Silometopus incurvatus (O. Pickard-Cambridge, 1873) – Europe, Russia (Europe to West Siberia), Central Asia
Silometopus minutus Tanasevitch, 2016 – Israel
Silometopus nitidithorax (Simon, 1915) – France, Greece
Silometopus pectinatus Tanasevitch, 2016 – Israel
Silometopus reussi (Thorell, 1871) – Europe, Russia (Europe to Far East), China
Silometopus rosemariae Wunderlich, 1969 – Spain, France, Germany, Switzerland, Austria, Italy
Silometopus sachalinensis (Eskov & Marusik, 1994) – Russia (Sakhalin), Japan
Silometopus tenuispinus Denis, 1950 – France, Andorra
Silometopus uralensis Tanasevitch, 1985 – Russia (Urals to Central Asia/Siberia)

See also
 List of Linyphiidae species (Q–Z)

References

Araneomorphae genera
Linyphiidae
Palearctic spiders
Spiders of Asia